U Jeong-hwan (16 July 1914 – 1953) was a South Korean footballer. He competed in the men's tournament at the 1948 Summer Olympics.

References

External links
 

1914 births
1953 deaths
South Korean footballers
South Korea international footballers
Olympic footballers of South Korea
Footballers at the 1948 Summer Olympics
Footballers from Seoul
Association football forwards